Vivienne Harris may refer to:

 Vivienne Harris (camogie), Cork camogie player
 Vivienne Harris (businesswoman) (1921–2011), British businesswoman, newspaper publisher and journalist

See also
Viv Harris, fictional character
Vivian Harris (disambiguation)